Most Reverend Michael Odogwu Elue (born April 4, 1956), into a Catholic family of Mr. Dominic Elue and Mrs. Theresa Elue of Akumazi Umuocha in Ika Northeast Local Government Area of Delta State, Nigeria. He is the first son and the second child in the family of eight children. His father died on August 18, 1984, the very day he was ordained to the Catholic priesthood.

Before his episcopal ordination as the third bishop of Issele-Uku diocese, on February 21, 2004, Bishop Odogwu held many pastoral and academic assignments of responsibility. Prominent among them were as Professor at All Saints Major Seminary Ekpoma, Nigeria, chaplain for inter-Religious Dialogue, member of liturgical commission to mention but a few. Bishop Odogwu holds Doctorate degree on Biblical theology from the University of Jerusalem and Rome.

See also
Roman Catholicism in Nigeria
List of Roman Catholic dioceses in Nigeria

References

External links
Roman Catholic Diocese of Issele-Uku official website
Catholic-Hierarchy.org page about this bishop
Catholic Bishops' Conference of Nigeria

1956 births
Living people
21st-century Roman Catholic bishops in Nigeria
Roman Catholic bishops of Issele-Uku